Novius is a genus of ladybird beetles belonging to the family Coccinellidae, and the sole member of the tribe Noviini. The genus as presently defined contains over 70 species, most of which were formerly placed in the genera Rodolia and Anovia, but after decades of debate, both of these genera are now considered to be junior synonyms of Novius.

Description 
Novius species have a semispherical body, covered with dense, short hairs. They are reddish-purple, with or without black spots.

Novius species regularly feed on scale insects, aphids and small mites, which makes them candidates as biological control agents. One such species used in biocontrol is Novius cardinalis, introduced worldwide in tropical and subtropical regions, and now effectively cosmopolitan. Other species have been introduced in more restricted areas (e.g., Micronesia), though always for the biological control of pest insects.

Species 

 Novius alluaudi (Sicard, 1909)
 Novius amabilis (Kapur, 1949)
 Novius andamanicus (Weise, 1901)
 Novius apicalis (Sicard, 1909)
 Novius argodi (Sicard, 1909)
 Novius bellus Blackburn, 1889
 Novius breviusculus (Weise, 1892)
 Novius canariensis Korschefsky, 1931
 Novius capucinus (Fürsch, 1975)
 Novius cardinalis (Mulsant, 1850) - Vedalia beetle
 Novius chapaensis (Hoang, 1980)
 Novius cinctipennis (Weise, 1912)
 Novius circumclusus (Gorham, 1899)
 Novius concolor (Lewis, 1879)
 Novius conicollis Korschefsky, 1931
 Novius contrarius (Sicard, 1931)
 Novius cruentatus Mulsant, 1846
 Novius delobeli (Chazeau, 1981)
 Novius fausti (Weise, 1885)
 Novius ferrugineus (Weise, 1900)
 Novius formosanus (Korschefsky, 1935)
 Novius fulvescens (Hoang, 1980)
 Novius fumidus (Mulsant, 1850)
 Novius hauseri Mader, 1930
 Novius iceryae (Janson, 1889)
 Novius insularis (Weise, 1895)
 Novius koebelei Olliff, 1892
 Novius limbatus Motschulsky, 1866
 Novius lindi Blackburn, 1889
 Novius lydiae (Chazeau, 1991)
 Novius manganensis (Singh, 2014)
 Novius marek Ślipiński & Pang, 2020
 Novius marginatus (Bielawski, 1960)
 Novius mayottensis (Fürsch, 2003)
 Novius mexicanus (Gordon, 1972)
 Novius minimus (Kapur, 1949)
 Novius minutus (Sicard, 1909)
 Novius netara (Kapur, 1949)
 Novius niger (Fürsch, 1995)
 Novius nigerrimus Fürsch, 1960
 Novius nigrofrontalis (Kapur, 1951)
 Novius obscuricollis (Sicard, 1931)
 Novius occidentalis (Weise, 1898)
 Novius octoguttatus (Weise, 1910)
 Novius parvulus (Kirsch & Mitteil, 1875)
 Novius peruvianus (Gordon, 1972)
 Novius picicollis (Weise, 1900)
 Novius podagricus (Weise, 1908)
 Novius pronuba (Chazeau, 1991)
 Novius prosternalis (Sicard, 1909)
 Novius pumila (Weise, 1892)
 Novius punctigera (Weise, 1901)
 Novius punicus (Gordon, 1972)
 Novius quadrimaculatus (Mader, 1939)
 Novius quadriplagiatus (Sicard, 1909)
 Novius quadrispilotus (Sicard, 1909)
 Novius rubeus (Mulsant, 1850)
 Novius ruficollis (Mulsant, 1850)
 Novius rufipennis (Pic, 1926)
 Novius rufocincta (Lewis, 1896)
 Novius rufopilosus (Mulsant, 1850)
 Novius sanguinolentus Mulsant, 1850
 Novius seabrai (Sicard, 1921)
 Novius senegalensis (Weise, 1913)
 Novius sexmaculatus (Korschefsky, 1940)
 Novius sexnotatus (Mulsant, 1850)
 Novius shuiro (Kitano, 2014)
 Novius songchuanus (Hoang, 1980)
 Novius tamdaoanus (Hoang, 1980)
 Novius usambaricus (Weise, 1898)
 Novius virginalis (Wickham, 1905)
 Novius vulpinus (Fürsch, 1974)
 Novius weisei (Gordon, 1972)
 Novius westermanni (Crotch, 1874)
 Novius xianfengensis (Xiao, 1992)
 Novius yemenensis Raimundo & Fürsch, 2006

References

Coccinellidae
Coccinellidae genera
Cosmopolitan arthropods